Cultwo is a South Korean comedy duo consisting of Jung Chan-woo and Kim Tae-gyun. Formed in 1994 as Cult Triple, in 2002, Jung Seong-han left the team. After which, Chan-woo and Tae-gyun renamed the team the current name. Their syndicated talk radio show Cultwo Show, airs via the SBS Power FM since 2006.

They appeared with Kim Tae-gyun's son, Kim Bum-jun, in Episode 20 of Roommate Season 2. Kim Tae-gyun revealed that since his son watches Roommate every other day, so he decided to make an appearance on the show. After they appeared on the show, Kim Tae-gyun shared that he longs for his deceased mother, who died in 2014 due to cancer. On the day of the cremation, Kim Tae-gyun also shared that his mother appeared in his dream. Kim Bum-jun is a fan of GOT7's Jackson.

Awards and nominations

References

External links 

 Cult Entertainment

South Korean comedy duos
South Korean musical duos
South Korean radio presenters
Comedy radio characters
Radio characters introduced in 1994
Male characters in radio
Male musical duos
Best Variety Performer Male Paeksang Arts Award (television) winners